The following is the solo discography of Smokey Robinson from 1973 to the present day. For information about Robinson's recorded output as a member of The Miracles, see The Miracles discography.  For a list of successful songs written by Robinson, see List of songs written by Smokey Robinson.

Albums
Tamla Motown releases

Motown releases

Other label releases

Singles

Billboard Year-End performances

Other appearances

See also

References

External links

Discographies of American artists
Rhythm and blues discographies
Soul music discographies